WCDG (88.7 FM) is a radio station licensed to Dahlonega, Georgia. The station broadcasts a Christian country and Christian talk and teaching format and is owned by Legacy Broadcasting, Inc.

Effective January 8, 2021, Legacy Broadcasting, also owners of KYMS in Idaho, acquired WCDG from Silver Dove Broadcasting, Inc. for $75,000.

References

External links
Official website

CDG